Chharpatra (1948) is a Bengali book of poems written by Sukanta Bhattacharya. Sukanta wrote the poems of this book from 1943–1947. He died of tuberculosis at the age of 20. Following his death, Chharpatra, a collection of his poetry  was published. Much of Bhattacharya poetry was heavily influenced by his experience living under the colonial rule of the British Empire.

Literary features

Chharpatra created a sensation when it first appeared. Sukanta picked up particular types of labour class people as the subject of his poetry. Some of his poetries in the book Chharpatra presented some magnificent hitherto which was unknown to the Bengali poetry readers. 
The book starts with the poetry Chharpatra— the theme of the poetry was– "A new child is born; we will have to make room for him." "I shall make this world a fit place for him to live in." 

One of his shorter poems name "Hey Mahajibon" (হে মহাজীবন) from the book Chharpatra compares the moon with a burnt roti, a prosaicness born of hunger:

List of selected poetries

Chharpatra
Aagami
Rabindranath-er Proti.
Chara gachh.
Khobor
Europe-er Uddeshye,
Prostut
Prarthi.
Ekti morogger kahini.
Sniri.
Kalam.
Agneyagiri.
Runner.
Chattagram: 1943
Oitihasik.
Shotru Ek
Daak
Bodhan.
Mrityunjoyi Gaan
Convoy
Hey Mohajibon.

References

External links 
Sukanta Bhattacharya's PRARTHI translated by Osman Gani
Sukanta Bhattacharya's HEY MAHAJIBAN translated by Osman Gani

Bengali poetry
1948 poems
Indian poetry collections